McHenry is a small unincorporated community in Stanislaus County, about 1 mile north of Modesto, California.

History

McHenry was never established, but settled. In the 1870s the people in the area constructed farmhouses and small shops, since McHenry Avenue crossed the town; the area was named McHenry. Robert McHenry was a local banker/rancher who owned the McHenry Mansion.

Unincorporated communities in California
Unincorporated communities in Stanislaus County, California